Disen Gage is a Russian rock band from Moscow.

History 

The band was formed in 1999 by Yuri Alaverdyan and Konstantin Mochalov on guitars, Nikolay Syrtsev on bass guitar and Eugeniy Kudryashov on drums.

Despite of having gained a certain degree of popularity in intellectual and student's communities, the band members decided to stop their musical activities: they were too busy pursuing their academic careers in the Moscow Institute of Bio-Organic Chemistry at the time.

In 2002 the band members grabbed a rare chance to record a farewell cassette, for their friends and fans.

In 2004 their recorded material reached the RAIG music label, which released it as the band's debut album under the title The Screw-Loose Entertainment. The album received positive reviews at many web sites, including Dutch Progressive Rock Page, Delusions of Adequacy (USA), In Rock (Russia), Grrove (Sweden), Splendid (USA), Progwereld (Netherlands), Art Rock Pl (Poland), Chaos Vault (Poland), and Mmusic in Belgium (Belgium), Nota-Bena (Russia), Impakte (Maroc). The album received a 9/10 rating from the Disagreement web site.

The success of the debut album prompted the band to resume its normal activity.

The same year the band played at InProg, Russia's most important progressive rock festival. Later in 2004 Yuri Alaverdyan left both the country and the band for an academic career abroad.

With the arrival of a new guitarist, Sergey Bagin who took the place of Yuri Alaverdyan the band became quartet again. The new guitarist helped Disen Gage to progress from a guitar-oriented progressive rock to a challenging avant-prog group.

2005 saw the band playing at InProg again.

In 2006 Disen Gage released its second album, Libertage which received Neformat-Boom (Russia), In Rock (Russia), Nota-Bena (Russia), Salon Audio-Video (Russia), Muz-Prosvet (Ukraine). While the reviews of the new album (like those of the previous one) were generally positive, this time they came mostly from Russia (its predecessor received many international positive reviews too).

After Libertage the band for a few years completely dedicated itself to touring and no information on a following album was released.

In 2008 the Disen Gage released its third studio album, ...the reverse may be true. Stylistically, it blended the structural constraints of the debut with the improvisational freedom of their sophomore release. Like the previous two, this one received high marks, good reviews coming again from many different countries. Among those who praised the LP were Inoi Lip (Russia), Sonic Frontiers (USA), Rate Your Music (USA), Progwereld (The Netherlands), Sea of Tranquility (USA), DisAgreement (Luxembourg).

In 2009 Kudryashov and Bagin contributed to the Marc Almond Orpheus in Exile on a number of tracks.

In 2015 Sergey Bagin left the band and the keyboardist Fyodor Amirov joined them.

Trivia 

 Libertage was spontaneously composed and improvised on the spot.
 The members of the group all continue with their academic careers besides their musical ones.
 On the poster of the InProg 2004 festival the name of the band was mistakenly printed in one word: Disengage.

Discography 

 The Screw-Loose Entertainment (2004, RAIG)
 Libertage (2006, RAIG)
 ...The Reverse May Be True (2008, RAIG)
 Snapshots (2016)
 Hybrid State (2017)
 Nature (2018)

See also 

 Music of Russia
 Russian rock

References

External links 
 Official site (Russian)
 About the band in the Russian Association of Independent Genres web-site  (English)
 About the band at the "Megastars" section of the Holmi-festival web-site (Russian)

Russian electronic musicians
Russian experimental musical groups
Russian progressive rock groups
Russian art rock groups
Musical groups from Moscow
Musical quartets